Marana Community Correctional Treatment Facility (MCCTF) is one of 13 prison facilities in Arizona housing prisoners of the Arizona Department of Corrections (ADC).   The facility is located in Marana, Pima County, Arizona, approximately 100 miles south of Phoenix, Arizona.  

The facility is a secure, minimum custody private prison under contract with the Arizona Department of Corrections to provide custody and substance abuse treatment for 450 adult male offenders who have demonstrated a need for substance or alcohol abuse intervention. The facility opened on October 7, 1994. It is operated and managed by Management and Training Corporation of Utah.

MCCTF has an inmate capacity of approximately 450 in 1 housing unit at security levels 2. The ADC uses a score classification system to assess inmates appropriate custody and security level placement. The scores range from 1 to 5 with 5 being the highest risk or need.

See also 
 List of Arizona state prisons

External links 
 Arizona Department of Corrections

Prisons in Arizona
Private prisons in the United States
Prison uprisings in the United States
Buildings and structures in Pima County, Arizona
Management and Training Corporation
1994 establishments in Arizona